The 2017–18 Oral Roberts Golden Eagles men's basketball team represented Oral Roberts University during the 2017–18 NCAA Division I men's basketball season. The Golden Eagles were led by first-year head coach Paul Mills and played their home games at the Mabee Center in Tulsa, Oklahoma as members of The Summit League. They finished the season 11–21, 5–9 in Summit League play to finish in a tie for fifth place. They lost in the quarterfinals of the Summit League tournament to Denver.

Previous season
The Golden Eagles finished the season 8–22, 4–12 in Summit League play to finish in last place. As a result, they failed to qualify for The Summit League tournament.

On April 10, 2017, the school fired all-time winningest coach Scott Sutton after 18 years. He finished with an overall record of 328–247. On April 28, the school hired Baylor assistant Paul Mills as the new head coach.

Preseason 
In a poll of league coaches, media, and sports information directors, the Golden Eagles were picked to finish in seventh place. Senior center Albert Owens was named to the preseason All-Summit First Team and sophomore forward Emmanuel Nzekwesi was named to the Second Team.

Roster

Schedule and results

|-
!colspan=9 style=| Regular season

|-
!colspan=9 style=| Summit League tournament

References

2017-18
2017–18 Summit League men's basketball season
2017 in sports in Oklahoma
2018 in sports in Oklahoma